Suzie Vinnick is a Canadian roots and blues singer-songwriter. She performs as a solo artist and contributes to variety of band projects, including The Marigolds (with Gwen Swick and Caitlin Hanford), Vinnick Sheppard Harte (with Kim Sheppard and Elana Harte), Betty and the Bobs and as a duo with Rick Fines.

Originally from Saskatoon, Saskatchewan, Vinnick is currently based in Toronto, Ontario.

Her music has appeared in commercials for Tim Hortons, Interac, Ontario Foodland, Tetley's Tea and Shoppers Drug Mart, as well as the soundtracks for MVP: The Secret Lives of Hockey Wives, ReGenesis and the film A Touch of Grey.

Awards
Vinnick is a six-time winner of the Maple Blues Award for Best Female Vocalist, winning in 2003, 2006, 2008, 2009, 2011 and 2013, and a two-time winner of the Maple Blues Award for Best Songwriter, winning in 2006 and 2011. She also won the award for Best Bassist in 2006 and Best Acoustic Act in 2013.

Her 2008 album Happy Here was a nominee for Roots & Traditional Album of the Year – Solo at the 2009 Juno Awards. Her 2011 album Me 'n Mabel was a nominee for Blues Album of the Year at the 2012 Juno Awards, and she won the award for Contemporary Singer of the Year at the 2011 Canadian Folk Music Awards. She and her co-producer, Mark Lalama were recently nominated at the Canadian Folk Music Awards for 2018 Producer of the Year for Suzie's latest release, "Shake The Love Around".

She is also a two-time winner in the blues category at the International Songwriting Competition, for her songs "The Honey I Want" and "Sometimes I Think I Can Fly".

Discography

Solo
Angel in the Sidelines (1994)
33 Stars (2002)
Happy Here (2008)
Me 'n Mabel (2011)
Live at Bluesville (2012)
Shake The Love Around (2018)
Fall Back Home (2022)

Rick Fines and Suzie Vinnick
Nothing Halfway (2006)

Betty and the Bobs
Betty and the Bobs (2006)

The Marigolds
The Marigolds (2005)
That's The State I'm In (2009)

Vinnick Sheppard Harte
And They All Rolled Over (2000)
My Favourite Shirt (2007)

Tony D And His Cool Band
Dig Deep (1992)

Compilation appearances
Dancing Alone: Songs of William Hawkins (2008): "Frankly Stoned"

References

External links
 
 

Living people
Canadian blues guitarists
Canadian blues singers
Canadian women singer-songwriters
Canadian folk guitarists
Canadian women folk guitarists
Canadian folk singer-songwriters
Musicians from Saskatoon
Musicians from Toronto
1970 births
20th-century Canadian women singers
21st-century Canadian women singers
Canadian Folk Music Award winners
21st-century Canadian guitarists
21st-century women guitarists